The 1963 Tulsa Golden Hurricane football team represented the University of Tulsa during the 1963 NCAA University Division football season. In their third year under head coach Glenn Dobbs, the Golden Hurricane compiled a 5–5 record (2–2 against Missouri Valley Conference opponents) and finished in third place in the conference. The team's statistical leaders included Jerry Rhome with 1,909 passing yards, Hank Dorsch with 211 rushing yards, and John Simmons with 543 receiving yards. Under Glenn Dobbs, Tulsa led the nation in passing for five straight years from 1962 to 1966.

Schedule

References

Tulsa
Tulsa Golden Hurricane football seasons
Tulsa Golden Hurricane football